The John McCaleb House is a historic house at Main Street and Sidney Road in Evening Shade, Arkansas.  It is a -story wood-frame structure with a gable roof studded with cross gables and dormers.  Built c. 1900, it is an outstanding local example of Queen Anne styling, with its complex massing and roofline, projecting gable sections, a recessed attic porch, an octagonal turret, and porch with turned posts and jigsawn brackets.  The interior retains significant period decoration, including woodwork and wallpaper.

The house was listed on the National Register of Historic Places in 1982.

See also
National Register of Historic Places listings in Sharp County, Arkansas

References

Houses on the National Register of Historic Places in Arkansas
Houses completed in 1900
Houses in Sharp County, Arkansas
National Register of Historic Places in Sharp County, Arkansas